I Feel Bad is an American sitcom, based on the book I Feel Bad: All Day. Every Day. About Everything by Orli Auslander, that premiered on September 19, 2018, on NBC. It stars Sarayu Blue, Paul Adelstein, Aisling Bea, Zach Cherry, Johnny Pemberton, and James Buckley and is executive produced by Aseem Batra, Julie Anne Robinson, Amy Poehler, Dave Becky, and Joshua D. Maurer. In November 2018, it was announced that the series would conclude in December 2018 and that NBC would make a decision regarding a potential renewal at a later date. In May 2019, the series was canceled after one season.

Premise
I Feel Bad follows Emet, a wife, mother, and career woman who "feels bad" when she deviates from her own standards of perfection while trying to "have it all."

Cast and characters

Main
 Sarayu Blue as Emet Kamala-Sweetzer
 Paul Adelstein as David Sweetzer, Emet's husband
 Madhur Jaffrey as Maya Kamala, Emet's mother
 Brian George as Sonny Kamala, Emet's father
 James Buckley as Chewey, Emet's co-worker
 Zach Cherry as Norman, Emet's co-worker
 Johnny Pemberton as Griff, Emet's co-worker

Recurring
 Lily Rose Silver as Lily, Emet and David's eldest child.
 Rahm Braslaw as Louie, Emet and David's middle child. In the pilot episode the character was portrayed by Callan Farris.

Guest
 Aisling Bea as Simone ("I Don't Want to Turn into My Mother"), Emet's best friend since college. The character was written out of the series following the pilot episode.
 Christopher Avila as Hux ("I Don't Want to Turn into My Mother"), Emet's co-worker. The character was written out of the series following the pilot episode.
 Easton Magliarditi as Tucker ("I Don't Want to Turn into My Mother")
 Jane Seymour as Chewey's Mom
 Debra Jo Rupp as Griff's Mom
 Parker Young as Damon Paul, Emet's boss
 Alfred Molina as Max, Adam's Father
 Caroline Aaron as Irene, Adam's Mother
 Taylor Misiak as Mackenzie ("I Get Sick of Being Needed")
 MYTEEN as Themself ("We're Not Fun Anymore")

Episodes

Production

Development
On February 2, 2018, it was announced that NBC had given the production a pilot order. The pilot episode was written by Aseem Batra based on the book I Feel Bad: All Day. Every Day. About Everything by Orli Auslander. Batra also acts an executive producer alongside Amy Poehler, Julie Anne Robinson, Dave Becky, and Joshua D. Maurer. Kelly Pancho and Kim Lessing are set as producers and Orli Auslander as a consulting producer. Production companies involved with the pilot include Universal Television, Paper Kite Productions, CannyLads Productions, and 3 Arts Entertainment.

On May 8, 2018, it was announced that NBC had given the production a series order. A few days later, it was announced that the series would premiere in the fall of 2018 and air on Thursdays at 9:30 p.m. On June 19, 2018, it was announced that the series would officially premiere on October 4, 2018 in its regular time-slot. On November 8, 2018, it was announced that the series would "conclude" in December 2018 and that NBC would make a decision regarding a potential renewal at a later date. On May 10, 2019, NBC canceled the series after one season.

Casting
On February 26, 2018, it was announced that Sarayu Blue and Paul Adelstein had been cast as the pilot's female and male leads, respectively. In March 2018, it was announced that Zach Cherry and James Buckley had also joined the main cast.

Release

Marketing
On May 13, 2018, NBC released the first official trailer for the series.

Premiere
On September 10, 2018, the series took part in the 12th annual PaleyFest Fall Television Previews, which featured a preview screening of the series and a conversation with cast members Sarayu Blue, Paul Adelstein, Madhur Jaffrey, and Brian George and executive producers Aseem Batra and Julie Anne Robinson.

Reception

Critical response
The series has been met with a mixed to negative response from critics upon its premiere. On the review aggregation website Rotten Tomatoes, the series holds an approval rating of 31% with an average rating of 5.06 out of 10, based on 16 reviews. The website's critical consensus reads, "Despite its promising pedigree, I Feel Bad simply isn't very funny." Metacritic, which uses a weighted average, assigned the series a score of 55 out of 100 based on 9 critics, indicating "mixed or average reviews".

Ratings

References

External links

2010s American single-camera sitcoms
2018 American television series debuts
2018 American television series endings
English-language television shows
NBC original programming
Television shows based on books
Television series by 3 Arts Entertainment
Television series by Paper Kite Productions
Television series by Universal Television